Fullerton High School may refer to:

Fullerton Union High School in California